8V or 8-V may refer to:
 Antoinette 8V, a 1907 French engine
 Fiat 8V, a 1952 sports car
HF Integrale 8v, a model of  Lancia Delta
8v, abbreviations for 8 volts
8V, abbreviation for 8-valve engine
 Octavarium (album), an album released by Dream Theater
B-8V, a model of  Bensen B-8
8v, a model of  Ford Duratec engine
8V-71, engine used in Detroit Diesel Series 71
8V-72, engine used in Detroit Diesel Series 92

See also
V8 (disambiguation)